Nyssa sinensis (Chinese tupelo) is a species of flowering plant in the family Cornaceae (or Nyssaceae), native to China and Vietnam.

Nyssa sinensis is known in cultivation as a more compact version of its relative Nyssa sylvatica (the black tupelo). Both plants, originating from swamps and wetlands, require moist conditions.

The cultivar ‘Jim Russell’ has gained the Royal Horticultural Society’s Award of Garden Merit.

References

Further reading
Chen, Z. "Studies on the Chemical Constituents of Chinese Tupelo (Nyssa sinensis)." CHINESE TRADITIONAL AND HERBAL DRUGS 27 (1996): 325–327.

sinensis
Trees of China
Trees of Vietnam
Plants described in 1891
Taxa named by Daniel Oliver